Marpent is a commune in the Nord department in northern France.
It hosts an important factory of railway rolling stock, the former .

Education
The École primaire publique Maurice Fostier is located in Marpent.

Heraldry

See also

Communes of the Nord department

References

Communes of Nord (French department)